Alexander Charlton (born February 24, 1980) is an American politician and former Republican member of the Pennsylvania House of Representatives from the 165th district, serving from 2017 through 2018.

Career
Charlton served as the president of the Delaware County Chamber of Commerce.  He was elected to the Pennsylvania House of Representatives for the 165th district in 2017.

He lost reelection in 2018 to Democratic challenger Jennifer O'Mara.

References

External links
Alex Charlton at Ballotpedia
Project Vote Smart – Representative Alex Charlton (PA) profile
Our Campaigns – Representative Alex Charlton (PA) profile

1980 births
21st-century American politicians
Living people
Republican Party members of the Pennsylvania House of Representatives